Verplanck may refer to:

Surname
 Abraham Isaacsen Verplanck (1606-1690), early settler to New Netherland, and progenitor of the Verplanck line in North America
 Catharina Verplanck (1639-1708), daughter of Abraham and wife of David Pieterse Schuyler, a progenitor of the Schuyler family
 Daniel C. Verplanck (1762–1834), American politician, son of Samuel Verplanck (1739–1820)
 Gulian Verplanck (c. 1636 - 1684) (also known as Gulyne, Galyna and Geleyn), son of Abraham Issacsen Verplanck and holder of a one-third interest in the Rombout Patent
 Gulian Verplanck (1698–1751), son of Samuel Verplanck (1669-1698)
 Gulian Verplanck (speaker) (1751–1799), American banker and politician, and youngest son of Gulian Verplanck (1698–1751)
 Gulian Crommelin Verplanck (1786–1870), American politician and son of Daniel C. Verplanck 
 Marlene VerPlanck (1933–2018), American jazz vocalist
 Samuel Verplanck (1669-1698), son of Gulian Verplanck (c. 1636 - 1684) 
 Samuel Verplanck (1739–1820), wholesale importer and banker, and eldest son of Gulian Verplanck (1698–1751)
 William Samuel Verplanck Junior (1916–2002), American psychologist

Given name
 Beekman V. Hoffman (Beekman Verplanck Hoffman, 1789–1834), American Navy officer
 Verplanck Colvin (1847–1920), American lawyer and topographical engineer
 Verplanck Van Antwerp (1807–1875), American Brevet Brigadier General

Places
Verplanck, New York, a hamlet in the town of Cortlandt, Westchester County, New York
Verplanck's Point

See also
Verplank, a surname